Boetius Epo (1529–November 16, 1599) was a lawyer and scholar from the Low Countries. He was born at Reduzum, in Friesland, in 1529. He studied at Cologne and Leuven, and made such rapid progress in the acquisition of the learned languages, that at the age of twenty he gave public lectures on Homer. He afterwards taught, not only at Leuven but at Paris, jurisprudence, the belles-lettres, and theology, and afterwards went to Geneva with a view to inquire if the religious principles of John Calvin were worthy of the reputation they had gained. Not satisfied, however, with them, Boetius Epo returned to the Catholic Church in which he had been educated, and confining his studies to the Civil Law and Canon Law, took the degree of doctor in 1561, at Toulouse. He then returned to Leuven, where he lectured until he was chosen one of the professors of the new University of Douai, an office which he held for twenty-seven years. He died November 16, 1599. He wrote many works on law and ecclesiastical history.

Notable works

References 

1529 births
1599 deaths
16th-century Dutch lawyers
People from Leeuwarden
Dutch academics
Dutch Catholics
Academic staff of the University of Douai
Dutch legal scholars